Nemours Auguste (1850-1915) was a notable Haitian diplomat.

In 1912 he was Chargé d'Affaires to Jacques Nicolas Leger, Secretary of State.  
He was the father of Alfred Auguste Nemours.

Writings
 Sur le choix d'une discipline, l'anglo-saxonne ou la française, 2 editions (1909) and (1986)
 Etude hygiénique sur l'usage de la flanelle en Contact direct avec la pea (1874) 
 Correspondence with Marian Anderson, n.d.
 Le dernier outrage : Monsieur Thoby et Boyer Bazelais (1884) 
 Les adversaires des chemins de fer d'Haïti (1895)
 Les adversaires des chemins de fer d'Haïti. Numéro 2 (1895)

References

1850 births
Haitian diplomats
Year of death missing